The Sea Has Risen (Hungarian: Föltámadott a tenger) is a 1953 Hungarian historical drama film directed by László Ranódy, Mihály Szemes and Kálmán Nádasdy. It stars János Görbe, Zoltán Makláry and Lajos Básti. The film portrays Sándor Petőfi and the events of the Hungarian Revolution of 1848.

Cast
 János Görbe as Petõfi Sándor
 Zoltán Makláry as Bem József
 Lajos Básti as Kossuth Lajos
 Miklós Szakáts as Görgey Artur
 Violetta Ferrari as Petõfiné, Szendrey Júlia
 Ádám Szirtes as Hajdu Gyurka, parasztlegény
 Gábor Mádi Szabó as Kicsi Gergely, székely közhuszár
 János Dömsödi as Ifj. Szárazberky, köznemes

References

Bibliography 
 Liehm, Mira & Liehm, Antonín J. The Most Important Art: Eastern European Film After 1945. University of California Press, 1977.

External links 
 

1953 films
1950s historical drama films
Hungarian historical drama films
1950s Hungarian-language films
Films directed by László Ranódy
Films directed by Kálmán Nádasdy
Films set in the 19th century
1953 drama films